Oberea vittata is a species of beetle in the family Cerambycidae. It was described by Blessig in 1873. It is known from Russia, China, Mongolia, and Japan.

Subspecies
 Oberea vittata infranigrescens Breuning, 1947
 Oberea vittata vittata Blessig, 1873

References

Beetles described in 1873
vittata